Ivanovskaya is a rural locality (a village) in Vozhegodskoye Urban Settlement, Vozhegodsky District, Vologda Oblast, Russia. The population was 6 as of 2002.

Geography 
The distance to Vozhega is 13 km. Podolnaya, Samoylovskaya, Pavlovskaya are the nearest rural localities.

References 

Rural localities in Vozhegodsky District